The 1982 Connecticut gubernatorial election took place on November 2, 1982. Incumbent Democratic governor Bill O'Neill had assumed the governor's office in 1980 after Ella Grasso resigned due to poor health. Grasso died just weeks later on February 5, 1981. Governor O'Neill defeated former Connecticut state senator Lewis Rome for his first full term in the governor's office.

Results

References

Gubernatorial
1982
Connecticut